The discography of Nathan Carter, an English-Irish country singer, consists of thirteen studio albums, six live albums and fourteen singles.

Albums

Studio albums

Live albums

Compilation albums

Singles

As lead artist

As featured artist

Promotional singles

DVDs

References

External links
 Official site
 Nathan Carter CDs & DVDs
 Nathan Carter - Facebook
 Nathan Carter - Twitter

Discographies of Irish artists